The Schönberger-Laumann 1892 is an early semi-automatic pistol, having received a patent in Austria in 25 November 1891, only a few months after the 11 July patent awarded to first semi-automatic design, the Salvator Dormus pistol. Austrian inventor Joseph Laumann modified his 8mm repeating pistol in 1892 to use a blowback actuated self-loading mechanism. The pistol retained the original large cocking lever attached to the underside of the frame in front of the trigger. Approximately thirty-five were manufactured before production ceased when the Austrian military rejected the design in 1896.

Sources

19th-century semi-automatic pistols
Semi-automatic pistols of Austria
World War I Austro-Hungarian infantry weapons